Cerocoma is a Palearctic genus of blister beetle, whose biology is poorly known. As in other members of the family, these insects are hypermetamorphic. Larval hosts of few species were described. Imagines show distinct sexual dimorphism in the feeding apparatus and the antennae. All species in this genus have aposematic colouration.

The antennae are 9-segmented, and the galea is modified into a sucking tube; imagines feed on pollen and nectar of Asteraceae and Apiaceae plants. The wings are well-developed, and the legs are long and slender.

Larvae of C. schreberi were found feeding on paralysed mantids collected by Tachytes wasps.

The genus is mostly Mediterranean in distribution, and encompasses about 27 species. Fauna Europaea lists 13 species The taxonomic division into two subgenera, Cerocoma and Metacerocoma (Kaszab, 1951) was considered unfounded by some authors. Based on morphological and molecular analysis, Turco and Bologna subdivided the genus into five subgenera: Cerocoma, Cerocomina, Mesocerocoma, Metacerocoma and Meloides.

List of species
Subgenus Metacerocoma
 Cerocoma ephesica Reitter, 1885
 Cerocoma prevezaensis Dvorak, 1993
 Cerocoma schreberi (Fabricius, 1781)

Subgenus Cerocoma
 Cerocoma adamovichiana (Piller et Mitterpacher, 1783)
 Cerocoma albopilosa Dvořák, 1993
 Cerocoma barthelemii Baudi, 1878
 Cerocoma dahli Kraatz, 1863
 Cerocoma festiva Faldermann, 1837
 Cerocoma gloriosa Mulsant, 1857
 Cerocoma graeca Maran, 1944
 Cerocoma kunzei E. Frivaldsky, 1835
 Cerocoma latreillei Baudi, 1878
 Cerocoma macedonica Maran, 1944
 Cerocoma muehlfeldi Gyllenhal, 1817
 Cerocoma schaefferi (Linnaeus, 1758)
 Cerocoma scovitzi Faldermann, 1837
 Cerocoma syriaca Abeille de Perrin, 1880
 Cerocoma turcica Pardo Alcaide, 1977
 Cerocoma vahli Fabricius, 1787

References

Meloidae
Tenebrionoidea genera
Beetles of Asia